The Camp of the Saints is a 1973 French dystopian fiction novel by author and explorer Jean Raspail. A speculative fictional account, it depicts the destruction of Western civilization through Third World mass immigration to France and the West. Almost forty years after its initial publication, the novel returned to the bestseller list in 2011.

On its publication, the book received praise from prominent French literary figures, and through time has also been praised by critics and politicians in Europe and the United States, but has also been criticized by both French- and English-language commentators for conveying themes described as racism, xenophobia, nativism, monoculturalism, and anti-immigration content. The novel is popular within far-right and white nationalist circles.

Inspiration
Raspail has said his inspiration came while at the French Riviera in 1971, as he was looking out at the Mediterranean.

The name of the book comes from a passage in the Book of Revelation depicting the apocalypse. Satan influences most of the nations of the Earth to gather for one final battle against "the camp of the saints," before being defeated for eternity:

Plot 
In Calcutta, India, Catholic priests promote the adoption of Indian children by those back in Belgium as a form of charity. When the Belgian government realizes that the number of Indian children raised in Belgium has reached 40,000 in just five years, an emergency policy attempts to halt the migration. Desperate for the chance to send their children to what they call a "land of plenty", a mob of desperate Indians swarms the consulate. As a Belgian aid worker works through the crowd, an Indian gong farmer known only as "the turd eater", carrying aloft his monstrously deformed child, begs him to take them back to Europe, to which the worker agrees.

The worker and farmer bring the crowd to the docks, where there are hundreds of ships once owned by European powers, now suited only for river traffic. Nevertheless, the crowd boards, and a hundred ships soon leave for Europe; conditions on board are cramped, unsanitary and miserable, with many passengers including children publicly fornicating. As the ships pass "the straits of Ceylon", helicopters swarm overhead, capturing images of the migrants  on board to be published in Europe. Meanwhile, on the Russian Far East, the Soviet troops see masses of Chinese ready to enter Siberia but are reluctant to fight them.

As the fleet crosses the Indian Ocean, the political situation in France becomes more charged. At a press conference about the crisis, a French official who offers a speech in praise of the migrants is confronted by a journalist who claims he is merely trying to "feed the invaders" and demands to know if France will "have the courage to stand up to" the migrants when they reach France. The official decries this question as morally offensive and threatens to throw the journalist out when he continues to yell. Other journalists seek to inflame tensions between the French and Africans and Arabs already living in the country. Over time, these journalists begin to write that the migrant fleet is on a mission to "enrich, cleanse and redeem the Capitalist West". At the same time as the fleet is praised by those in Paris, the people of Southern France, terrified of the migrants' arrival, flee to the north.

As the fleet approaches the Suez Canal, Egyptian military forces fire a warning shot, causing the fleet to steer south, around the Cape of Good Hope. To the surprise of observers, the apartheid regime of South Africa floats out barges of food and supplies, which the migrants throw overboard. The international press is thrilled, believing the rejection of these supplies to be a political statement against the apartheid South African regime. Western leaders, confident the migrants will accept supplies from their "more virtuous" nations, organize a supply mission, funded by governments, charities, rock stars and major churches, to meet the migrants off São Tomé. However, the fleet does not stop for these barges either, and when a worker from the Pope's barge attempts to board one of the ships, he is strangled and thrown overboard. The press attempts to contain coverage of the murder.

When the migrants pass through the Strait of Gibraltar, the French president orders troops to the south and addresses the nation with his plan to repel them. However, in the middle of the address, he breaks down, demanding the troops simply follow their consciences instead. Most of the troops immediately desert their posts and join the civilians as they flee north, and the south is quickly overrun by the migrants. Some of the last troops to stand their ground take refuge in a small village, along with Calguès, an old man who has chosen to remain at his home, and Hamadura, a Westernized Indian who is terrified of his "filthy, brutish" countrymen and prides himself on having more in common with whites than Indians. The troops in this village, a total of nineteen Frenchmen and one Indian, surrounded by what they deem "occupied territory", remain the last defense of Western values and "Free France" against the immigrants.

The immigrants make their way north, having no desire to assimilate to French culture, but continuing to demand a First World standard of living, even as they flout laws, do not produce, and murder French citizens, such as factory bosses and shopkeepers, as well as the ordinary people who do not welcome them. They are also joined by the immigrants who already reside in Europe, as well as various left-wing and anarchist groups. Across the West, more and more migrants arrive and have children, rapidly growing to outnumber whites. In a matter of months, the white West has been overrun and pro-immigrant governments have been established, while the white people are ordered to share their houses and flats with the immigrants. The village containing the troops is bombed flat by airplanes of the new French government, referred to only as the "Paris Multiracial Commune". Within a few years, most Western governments have surrendered. The mayor of New York City is made to share Gracie Mansion with three African-American families from Harlem; migrants gather at coastal ports in West Africa and South Asia and swarm into Europe, Australia, and New Zealand; London is taken over by an organization of non-white residents known as the "Non-European Commonwealth Committee", who force the British queen to have her son marry a Pakistani woman; millions of black Africans from around the continent gather at the Limpopo River and invade South Africa; and only one drunken Soviet soldier stands in the way of hundreds of thousands of Chinese peasants as they overrun Siberia.

The epilogue reveals that the story was written in the last holdout of the Western world, Switzerland, but international pressure from the new governments, isolating it as a rogue state for not opening its borders, along with internal pro-migrant elements, force it to capitulate as well. Mere hours from the border opening, the author dedicates the book to his grandchildren, in the hopes they will grow up in a world where they will not be ashamed of him for writing such a book.

Analysis 
According to literary scholar Jean-Marc Moura, native French people are described in the novel as "[giving] in without a blow to the hyperbolic egalitarianism that 'swallows' them down to the rank of third-world men ... In such a context, racist deviations are inevitable ... The plot is thus biased, since the cards are dealt in such a way that racism and ostracism become conditions for survival. By painting the Third World in such aggressive colours, it gives Western characters little choice: destroy or die."

In 2001, the Southern Poverty Law Center (SPLC) described The Camp of the Saints as "widely revered by American white supremacists" and "a sort of anti-immigration analog to The Turner Diaries", and attributed its popularity to the plot's parallels with the white genocide conspiracy theory. Ryan Lenz, a senior investigative reporter for the SPLC, notes that "[t]he premise of Camp of the Saints plays directly into that idea of white genocide. It is the idea that through immigration, if it's left unchecked, the racial character and content of a culture can be undermined to the point of oblivion." Political scientist Jean-Yves Camus argues that The Camp of the Saints, with its apocalyptical vision of a sudden and violent mass migration swarming towards Europe, is even more radical than Renaud Camus' Great Replacement theory, and therefore probably more influential on white nationalist terrorists.

Reception

First edition 
The Camp of the Saints initially received a positive reception in France, with most critics focusing on the "prophetic" nature of the story. It was praised by journalist Bernard Pivot and intellectuals such as Jean Anouilh, Hervé Bazin, Michel Déon, Jean Cau, Thierry Maulnier,  and Louis Pauwels.

After the book was translated into English in 1975, journalist Max Lerner wrote that it had "irresistible pace of skill and narrative". Philosopher Sidney Hook said that it would "succeed in shocking and challenging the complacent contemporary mind." In 1975, Time magazine panned the novel as a "bilious tirade" that only required a response because it "arrives trailing clouds of praise from French savants, including dramatist Jean Anouilh ('A haunting book of irresistible force and calm logic'), with the imprint of a respected U.S. publisher and a teasing pre-publication ad campaign ('The end of the white world is near')".

Jeffrey Hart, in a 1975 National Review article, mocked the rejection of the novel by critics, deriding them as "respectable, comfortable reviewers", and lauded the book in those terms: "in freer and more intelligent circles in Europe, the book is a sensation and Raspail is a prize-winner [...] his plot is both simple and brilliant." Syndicated columnist Garry Wills, writing in the Journal Inquirer, condemned the embrace of the novel by the "more 'respectable' channels" of American right-wing media, including Jeffrey Hart, drawing parallels between the "racial implications" of the book and the National Reviews "overtly racist analysis" of school integration efforts. Kirkus Reviews compared the novel to Mein Kampf. In 1983, Linda Chavez called the novel "a sickening book", describing it as "racist, xenophobic and paranoid."

In the early 1980s, the director of the French intelligence service SDECE, Alexandre de Marenches, gave a copy of the book to Ronald Reagan, who reportedly stated that he was "terribly impressed" with it. The December 1994 cover story of The Atlantic Monthly focused on the themes of the novel, analyzing them in the context of international relations, while describing it as "the most politically incorrect book in France in the second half of the twentieth century". Its authors, British historian Paul Kennedy and Columbia professor Matthew Connelly further wrote, "many members of the more prosperous economies are beginning to agree with Raspail's vision".

Later reception 
In 2002, columnist Lionel Shriver described the novel as "both prescient and appalling", certainly "racist" but "written with tremendous verbal energy and passion." Shriver writes that the book "gives bilious voice to an emotion whose expression is increasingly taboo in the West, but that can grow only more virulent when suppressed: the fierce resentment felt by majority populations when that status seems threatened."

William F. Buckley, Jr. praised the book in 2004 as "a great novel" that raised questions on how to respond to massive illegal immigration, and in 2014, Mackubin Thomas Owens noted Buckley's praise of it, while remarking that "Raspail was ahead of his time in demonstrating that Western civilization had lost its sense of purpose and history—its 'exceptionalism'." In 2005, the conservative Chilton Williamson praised the book as "one of the most uncompromising works of literary reaction in the 20th century."

In March 2011, the book returned to the bestseller list, ranking in the top five in bookstores in France. It has been favorably referred to by Steve Bannon, U.S. President Donald Trump's former Chief Strategist. It has also been promoted by Trump's senior policy advisor Stephen Miller, GOP Congressman Steve King, French National Rally leader Marine Le Pen and Hungarian Prime Minister Viktor Orbán. A 2015 report from the SPLC described the novel as "the favorite racist fantasy of the anti-immigrant movement in the US".

On February 26, 2021, the Australian Classification Board classified the book as "Unrestricted", without the consumer advice letter M for Mature, meaning that it was not found inappropriate for children under fifteen.

English translations 
An English language translation by Norman Shapiro was published by Scribner in 1975. It was republished in mass market paperback format in 1977 by Ace Books and Sphere Books. John Tanton acquired the rights to the book in 1994 and printed a softcover edition through his publishing company The Social Contract Press. The Winter 1994-1995 issue of The Social Contract Journal was a special edition released to coincide with the new printing of the book, each article dedicated to discussion of the book and its themes.

See also 
 List of dystopian literature
 Rivers of Blood speech, a 1968 anti-immigration speech by British politician Enoch Powell
 Submission, a 2015 French novel about a political takeover of France by Islamic fundamentalists
 The March, a 1990 movie with a similar plot
 The Turner Diaries

References

External links 
 Full text of the 1975 English translation published by Charles Scribner’s Sons at Internet Archive
 
 Setze, J.F. "Le Camp Des Saints." Défense de l'Occident, No. 111, May–June 1973 (French)

1973 French novels
Apocalyptic novels
Conspiracist media
Éditions Robert Laffont books
French science fiction novels
Invasion literature
Novels by Jean Raspail
Novels set in Egypt
Novels set in Gibraltar
Novels set in Kolkata
Novels set in Provence
Novels set in Siberia
Novels set in South Africa
Dystopian novels
Works about illegal immigration to Europe
White genocide conspiracy theory
Race-related controversies in literature
Racism in France
Anti-immigration politics in Europe